The Carl Zeiss Planar 50mm  is one of the largest relative aperture (fastest) lenses in the history of photography.
The lens was designed and made specifically for the NASA Apollo lunar program to capture the far side of the Moon in 1966.

Stanley Kubrick used these lenses when shooting his film Barry Lyndon, which allowed him to shoot scenes lit only by candlelight.

In total there were only 10 lenses made. One was kept by Carl Zeiss, six were sold to NASA, and three were sold to Kubrick.

See also  
Zeiss Planar

References

External links
 History of fast 35mm and small format film lenses
 Photo of the lens
 A schematic view of the optical design of the lens
  Includes a discussion of the lens and how it was fitted to a movie camera for shooting Barry Lyndon
  OMAGGIO ALL'IMMORTALE KUBRICK ED AL MITICO PLANAR 50mm f/0,7
  # sk Objectifs ultra-lumineux

50
Stanley Kubrick